Poľana is a small mountain range in central Slovakia. It lies in the north-eastern part of the Slovak Central Mountains. The highest hill is Poľana - an inactive stratovolcano - at 1,458 m (4,873 ft) ASL.

The mountain range is bordered by Slovak Ore Mountains in the east, more precisely its subdivision the Vepor Mountains, and by the Zvolen Basin in the south and west.

Since 1981 the mountain range is protected by the Poľana Protected Landscape Area. Municipalities nearby include Hrochoť, Očová, Detva, Hriňová and Ľubietová.

References

Mountain ranges of Slovakia
Ski areas and resorts in Slovakia
Mountain ranges of the Western Carpathians